The Antero Soriano Highway, also partly known as Centennial Road, is a two-to-six lane,  highway traversing through the western coast of Cavite. It is one of the three major highways located in the province, the others are Aguinaldo Highway and Governor's Drive.

The northeastern terminus of the highway is at Kawit then travels along the cities of Imus and General Trias, municipalities of Noveleta, Rosario, Tanza and ends at the municipality of Naic.

The highway is designated as a component part of National Route 64 (N64) and National Route 402 (N402) of the Philippine highway network.

The highway was named after Antero Soriano, a native of Tanza who served as the country's senator, representative, and governor of Cavite.

Route description

Antero Soriano Highway starts at the intersection with Manila–Cavite Expressway (CAVITEX), Tirona Highway, and Covelandia Road in Kawit as the logical continuation of CAVITEX. It runs to the southwest, parallel to the coast of Cavite, bypassing the poblacions of Kawit, Noveleta, Rosario, General Trias, and Tanza and the Cavite Economic Zone. At the junction with Tanza–Trece Martires Road and San Agustin Street in Tanza, the route number transitions from N64 to N402 as it approaches Naic. It enters Naic, where N402 shifts towards the poblacion, making the highway a tertiary road up to its end at the intersection with Governor's Drive and Sabang Road at Naic junction.

Alternative names
From General Trias to Kawit, the highway is also widely known as Centennial Road. A component of N64, the highway is also known as Kawit–Noveleta Diversion Road, Noveleta–Rosario Diversion Road, and Tanza Diversion Road as it bypasses the poblacions of Kawit, Rosario, Noveleta, and Tanza, respectively. Excluding the aforementioned bypass roads, it is also known as Noveleta–Naic–Tagaytay Road, the network of roads that connect Noveleta and Tagaytay. The tertiary road portion of the highway in Naic is named Juanito R. Remulla Sr. Road (also known as Governor's Drive) by the Department of Public Works and Highways.

History
The present road originated from an old road that linked the municipalities of Naic and Tanza. It was part of Highway 25 that connected Bacoor with Tagaytay. In 1969, the highway was renamed in honor of Antero Soriano by virtue of Republic Act No. 5782. It was later extended to the northeast from Tanza to Kawit, with the section also known in the present-day as Centennial Road.

Intersections

References

External links

 Department of Public Works and Highway

Roads in Cavite